St Clement's Cottage is a building in the Scottish town of Dunblane, Stirling. Located in The Cross, immediately to the south of Dunblane Cathedral, it is a Category B listed structure dating to the mid-19th century. It adjoins Cathedral Cottage, on its northern side, also of Category B listed status.

Gallery

See also
List of listed buildings in Dunblane

References

External links
Location next to Dunblane Cathedral – Google Street View, October 2016

19th-century establishments in Scotland
Listed buildings in Dunblane
Category B listed buildings in Stirling (council area)